Club Gijón Basket 2015 Corpi, better known as Gijón Basket or Huniko GB2015 for sponsorship reasons, is a basketball club based in Gijón, Asturias that currently plays in Liga EBA, the fourth tier of Spanish basketball.

History

Gijón Basket was founded in 2015 as a merge of men's basketball club CB Corpi and women's basketball Formabasket. It has the aim to replace Gijón Baloncesto, that was dissolved in 2009, as the main club of the city.

On 8 May 2016, Gijón Basket completed its first competitive season promoting to Liga EBA, fourth tier, after finishing the 2015–16 season as champion of the Asturian group of Primera División. It defeated CB Castrillón in the final by 77–50.

On 9 October 2016, Gijón Basket made its debut in Liga EBA in Vigo, earning a 43–68 win against Seis do Nadal, but finally could not avoid the relegation to Primera División. However, they remained in the league due to the existence of vacant spots.

In their second season in the fourth tier, Gijón Basket performed successfully and qualified to the second stage of the league, where they were eliminated in the semifinals.

Head coaches
Chus Poves 2015–2017
Fran Sánchez 2017–

Season by season

Current squad

Individual records
Top performers of Gijón Basket, as of the end of the 2019–20 season.

Most capped players

Top scorers

Presidents
Carmen Puente 2015–2019
Iván Petrovich 2019–present

References

External links
 
Profile at Asturcesto 

Basketball teams in Asturias
Sport in Gijón
Basketball teams established in 2015
Liga EBA teams